The women's sprint competition at the Biathlon World Championships 2007 was held on 3 February 2007.

Results
The race was started at 14:15.

References

Women's Sprint
2007 in Italian women's sport